Spatalistis is a genus of moths belonging to the subfamily Tortricinae of the family Tortricidae.

The original description of this genus by Edward Meyrick is:
The antennae in the male are simple. Palpi moderately long, porrected, second joint rough-scaled above and beneath. Forewings with tufts of scales on surface, in the male sometimes with expansible brush of hairs from towards costa anteriorly, but without membranous fold; 3 and 4 stalked, 7 to termen. Hindwings with 3 and 4 stalked, 5 approximated, 6 and 7 closely approximated towards base.

Species
Spatalistis aglaoxantha Meyrick, 1924
Spatalistis alleni Razowski, 2012
Spatalistis armata Razowski, 1966
Spatalistis bifasciana (Hubner, [1787])
Spatalistis christophana (Walsingham, 1900)
Spatalistis crocomis (Meyrick, 1908)
Spatalistis delta Razowski, 2003
Spatalistis droserantha (Meyrick, 1930)
Spatalistis dulcedana Kuznetzov, 1992
Spatalistis egesta Razowski, 1974
Spatalistis gerdia Diakonoff, 1976
Spatalistis gratiosa Razowski, 1964
Spatalistis hormota Meyrick, 1907
Spatalistis katmandana Razowski, 2012
Spatalistis nephritica Razowski, 1966
Spatalistis numismata Diakonoff, 1968
Spatalistis orbigera Meyrick, 1912
Spatalistis philauta Diakonoff, 1983
Spatalistis phulchokia Razowski, 2012
Spatalistis rhopica Meyrick, 1907
Spatalistis translineata Meyrick, 1921
Spatalistis tyrophthora Meyrick, 1912
Spatalistis violacea Diakonoff, 1953
Spatalistis viridphantasma Razowski, 2012
Spatalistis zygota Razowski, 1964

See also
List of Tortricidae genera

References

 , 2005: World catalogue of insects volume 5 Tortricidae
 , 1968 Microlepidoptera of the Philippine Islands. United States National Museum Bulletin, 257: 7–100, 300–337, 414–425. Full article: 
 , 2012: Descriptions of new Tortricini from the Oriental and Australian regions (Lepidoptera: Tortricidae). Shilap Revista de Lepidopterologia 40 (159): 315–335. Full article: .

External links
tortricidae.com

 
Tortricini
Tortricidae genera
Taxa named by Edward Meyrick